Saint-Bauzille may refer to three communes in the Hérault department in southern France:
 Saint-Bauzille-de-la-Sylve
 Saint-Bauzille-de-Montmel
 Saint-Bauzille-de-Putois

See also 
 Saint-Bauzile (disambiguation)